Mather Peaks (elevation range is ) is located in the Bighorn Mountains in the U.S. state of Wyoming. The peak is the sixth highest in the range and it is in the Cloud Peak Wilderness of Bighorn National Forest.

References

Mountains of Big Horn County, Wyoming
Mountains of Johnson County, Wyoming
Mountains of Wyoming
Bighorn National Forest